From 7 January until 12 January 2023, separatist West Papua National Liberation Army (TPNPB) periodically attacked Oksibil, the seat of Bintang Mountains Regency, Highland Papua. According to the Regional Police of Papua, Bintang Mountains is one of 7 regencies that are vulnerable to separatist attacks.

Background 
, the spokesman for TPNPB and OPM, revealed on  January 7 that the 35th Regional Defense Commando "Eastern Stars" planned to kill Indonesian policemen, destroy police vehicles, and burn down a 4G tower in Oksibil.

Timeline

7 January: Shootout with armed criminal group 
Combined TNI-Polri forces were involved in a shootout with an armed criminal group at Kabiding Road for 2 hours. The shootout began when La Ode Jamaludin, a motorcycle taxi driver (ojek) reported to the local police that he was shot on a bridge at Yapimakot Road. After the combined forces successfully defeated the armed criminal group, they escaped to a forest. According to Inspector General Mathius D. Fakhiri, three police officers were injured in the shootout.

9 January 2023: Burning of a school and airliner attacks 
An armed criminal group whose leadership is unclear (possibly Nelson Mimin or Ananias Ati Mimin) burned the teachers' room and a classroom of the state vocational school SMKN 1 Oksibil building at around 10:30 AM local time. They also shot at Trigana and Dimonim Air aircraft, at 10:21 AM and 10:35 AM local time, respectively. For the case of Trigana Air, a cargo Ikairos Caravan registered under PK-HVV and piloted by Captain Tohirin was attacked when landing from Tanahmerah, Boven Digoel Regency. After the attack, the aircraft returned to Tanah Merah.

Because of the airliner attacks, Trigana Air temporarily stopped flight from or to Oksibil. The state-owned air traffic controller  also withdrew all personnels from Oksibil Airport on 12 January to evacuate into Jayapura. The armed criminal group threatened to eat the newcomers if they did not leave Bintang Mountains.

11 January 2023: Burning of Dukcapil office
The 35th Regional Defense Commando (Kodap) of TPNPB burned a Department of Population and Civil Record (Disdukcapil) office at around 01:30 AM local time. The fire was only extinguished at around 03:15 AM local time.

12 January 2023: Damaging of water pipe
In Mabilabol village, Oksibil, an armed criminal group led by Ananias Ati Mimin damaged a water pipe at 2:00 PM local time. Two days later, they also shot at a TNI aircraft ten times at Yapimakot village, Serambakon district, not far from Oksibil.

Impacts 
Commander of Korem 172/PWY, Brigadier General JO Sembiring stated that the economy in Oksibil was paralyzed by the separatist conflicts. The civilians were still evacuating themselves to Koramil 1705-01 base and An-Nur Mosque.

References

Attacks in 2023
History of Highland Papua
January 2023 events in Indonesia
Papua conflict